The Kensington Football Club was one of the first Australian rules football clubs founded in South Australia and played an integral part in the game's development in the state. The early rules used in South Australia were referred to as the "Kensington Rules". Club uniform was a scarlet cap and jacket and white trousers.  
The club was one of the founding teams of the South Australian Football Association (later renamed the SANFL) in 1877. 
For the 1881 SAFA season it merged with Old Adelaide Football Club. The first meeting of the merged club was held on Monday 11 April 1881 at the Prince Alfred Hotel. It was decided that the colour of the club be black and scarlet guernsey, hose, and cap, and navy blue knickerbockers.  
The Club resigned from the Association on 1 June 1881 after only 4 games in the 1881 SAFA season.
Kensington Club continued to play football matches from the 1882 Season (but not in the SAFA) and also held Athletic Sports Days.  A friendly reunion match of the old Kensington and new Kensington members was held on Saturday 29 September 1883. The Old Kensington winning 8 goals to 2.

References

External links
AustralianFootball.com profile

Former South Australian National Football League clubs
1871 establishments in Australia
1881 disestablishments in Australia
Australian rules football clubs established in 1871